Hannah's Gift – Lessons From a Life Fully Lived is a non-fiction book by Maria Housden.

Overview
Hannah's Gift tells the story of Hannah Catherine Martell, a young girl who was diagnosed with a rhabdoid tumor of the kidney, a rare and aggressive form of cancer, at age two and died at age three. The author, Maria Housden, is Hannah's mother, and the book documents her struggle to come to terms with her daughter's sickness and inevitable death while making changes in her own life.

Reception
Hannah's Gift has been translated into 13 languages. While some reviewers focus on the book's message of living life to its fullest and as a resource for bereaved parents, others laud it for showcasing Hannah's ability to understand what was happening to her and accept it.

The book includes biblical references and a Christian perspective, but its lessons about love and faith are universal.  One reviewer noted that, as a Muslim, her feelings towards Allah were bolstered.

Hannah's Gift has been recommended as a grief-coping book by the BBC, while Hannah herself was the inspiration for an award at the Riley Hospital for Children. Since writing Hannah's Gift, Housden has become a sought-after speaker on the subject of grief.

Aspects
The themes below are used as chapter titles
 truth
 joy
 faith
 compassion
 wonder

Publication history
 Housden, M, Hannah's Gift: Lessons from a Life Fully Lived, Bantam Books, 2002, 
 Housden, M, Hannah's Gift: Lessons from a Life Fully Lived, DIANE Publishing Co., 2002. 

 Housden, M. Hannah's Gift: Lessons from a Life Fully Lived Harper Collins Publishers, 2003.

Footnotes

External links
 Hannah's Gift official site (includes "The Heart of Hannah's Gift" forum)
 The Heal Project - Hannah's Friends children's hospice program inspired by Hannah's Gift
 The Atlantic Monthly  book review by Sandra Tsing Loh
 Blog Talk Radio interview with Maria Housden, author of Hannah's Gift
 Voice America Dr. Gloria Horsley discusses Hannah's Gift with Maria Housden
 Marie Claire magazine
 Riley Children's Hospital Red Shoe Award, inspired by Hannah's Gift
 Johns Hopkins Children's Center
 University of the Cumberlands Window of Hope dedication to Hannah Martell, reference Hannah's Gift
Bệnh Trầm Cảm: Nguyên nhân, dấu hiệu và chữa trị không dùng thuốc
Rối loạn lo âu lan tỏa là gì?

2002 non-fiction books